

Team 

World Artistic Gymnastics Championships
1994 in gymnastics